Amy Duncan may refer to:

Amy Duncan (singer), Scottish singer-songwriter
Amy Duncan (Good Luck Charlie), television character